The 1949–50 season was Stoke City's 43rd season in the Football League and the 29th in the First Division.

In June 1949, Stoke legend Freddie Steele left after 17 years with the club, scoring 159 goals. Stoke failed to find a suitable replacement, struggled throughout the season and ended up in a relegation battle. There was no end of season improvement in results and Stoke only stayed up due to the poor form of the relegated bottom two Birmingham City and Manchester City.

Season review

League
With Freddie Steele now moved on to Mansfield Town, the simmering unrest continued with Neil Franklin eager to move his family away from the Stoke-on-Trent area for health reasons. The local air at this time was far from clean due to the pottery industry at its peak and with kilns belching out smoke and fumes. With Steele gone manager Bob McGrory searched for a replacement and went out and spent £3,000 on Verdi Godwin from Manchester City, hoping that he would help the club find their goalscoring touch.

Franklin re-signed for the club in time for the 1949–50 season and his presence bolstered the defence whilst the forward line was struggling. By the end of October Stoke had just two wins to their name and were in deep relegation trouble so McGrory smashed the club's transfer record by paying £9,000 to Celtic for Leslie Johnston. However whilst Johnston was a fine footballer in Scotland he was not really up to the standard in English football and although he scored 22 goals in 92 games he was not the right player for the number 9 shirt. On 15 October Frank Baker broke his leg for the fifth time in two years and he decided to retire.

By January, there had been a modest improvement in performances out on the pitch and McGrory made his best signing for some time, persuading Freddie Steele who was now player-manager at Mansfield to part with young up and coming forward Harry Oscroft, Stoke handing over £8,000 plus Verdi Godwin who scored just twice in 23 matches. Soon after Oscroft's arrival, Stoke's defence started to leak goals and FA Cup finalists Arsenal put six past them at Highbury without a Stoke reply. Stoke managed just three points from their remaining eight matches this season and narrowly avoided relegation.

FA Cup
47,000 fans saw Stoke's cup run end at the third round losing 1–0 at home to Second Division Tottenham Hotspur.

Final league table

Results

Stoke's score comes first

Legend

Football League First Division

FA Cup

Squad statistics

References

Stoke City F.C. seasons
Stoke City